Struszia is a genus of fossil trilobites from the Silurian period, erected in 1993 and named after paleontologist Desmond L. Strusz.

Species
The genus contains 16 species, several of them named after members of The Beatles or people connected to the band:

 Struszia concomitans (Přibyl & Vaněk, 1962)
 Struszia dimitrovi (Perry & Chatterton, 1979)
 Struszia epsteini Adrain & Edgecombe, 1997 (named after Brian Epstein)
 Struszia harrisoni Edgecombe & Chatterton, 1993 (named after George Harrison)
 Struszia hilarula (Kegel, 1927) 
 Struszia indianensis (Kindle & Breger, 1904) 
 Struszia martini Adrain & Edgecombe, 1997 (named after George Martin)
 Struszia mccartneyi Edgecombe & Chatterton, 1993 (named after Paul McCartney)
 Struszia obtusa (Angelin, 1851) 
 Struszia onoae Adrain & Edgecombe, 1997 (named after Yoko Ono)
 Struszia petebesti Adrain & Edgecombe, 1997 (named after Pete Best)
 Struszia ramskoeldi (Edgecombe, 1990)
 Struszia rosensteinae (Tripp et al., 1977)
 Struszia subvariolaris (Münster, 1840)
 Struszia testosteron (Šnajdr, 1981)
 Struszia transiens (Barrande, 1852)

The following species were formerly in genus Struszia (subgenus Avalanchurus), but were moved out when Avalanchurus was promoted to genus status:
 Avalanchurus dakon (Šnajdr, 1983)
 Avalanchurus lennoni Edgecombe & Chatterton, 1993 (named after John Lennon)
 Avalanchurus starri Edgecombe & Chatterton, 1993 (named after Ringo Starr)

See also
 List of organisms named after famous people (born 1900–1949)

References

External links
 Struszia at the Paleobiology Database

Fossils of British Columbia
Encrinuridae genera
Paleozoic life of the Northwest Territories
Paleozoic life of Nunavut
Encrinuridae